Diabolo is a genus of moths belonging to the family Tortricidae. It contains only one species, Diabolo diantoniorum, which is found in Ecuador.

References

External links
tortricidae.com

Chlidanotini
Moths described in 2007
Moths of South America